This is a list of properties and districts in Forsyth County, Georgia that are listed on the National Register of Historic Places (NRHP).

Current listings

|}

References

Forsyth
Buildings and structures in Forsyth County, Georgia